General Silva may refer to:

Gratian Silva (1933–2015), Sri Lankan Army major general
Henry Rangel Silva (born 1961), Venezuelan Armed Forces general-in-chief
Lucius Flavius Silva (fl. late 1st century), Roman general
Shavendra Silva (fl. 1980s–2020s), Sri Lanka Army general

See also
Attorney General Silva (disambiguation)